Palouse is a city in Whitman County, Washington, United States. The population was 998 at the 2010 census.

History
Palouse was first settled in 1869 by William Ewing.  The townsite was founded in 1875 by W.P. Breeding.

Palouse is named for the region of farmland in which it is situated, and was incorporated in 1888.

Palouse adopted a city flag on August 27, 2019, following a campaign started by a local resident. The flag consists of a green field with a gold and blue knot that represents the city's people, commerce, and the Palouse River.

Geography

Demographics

2010 census
As of the census of 2010, there were 998 people, 429 households, and 291 families living in the city. The racial makeup of the city was 94.4% White, 1.3% Native American, 0.9% Asian, 0.4% from other races, and 3.0% from two or more races. Hispanic or Latino of any race were 2.4% of the population.

There were 429 households, of which 29.4% had children under the age of 18 living with them, 57.6% were married couples living together, 7.2% had a female householder with no husband present, 3.0% had a male householder with no wife present, and 32.2% were non-families. 27.5% of all households were made up of individuals, and 10.3% had someone living alone who was 65 years of age or older. The average household size was 2.29 and the average family size was 2.79.

The median age in the city was 43.8 years. 21.4% of residents were under the age of 18; 4.9% were between the ages of 18 and 24; 26.2% were from 25 to 44; 32.9% were from 45 to 64; and 14.4% were 65 years of age or older. The gender makeup of the city was 49.5% male and 50.5% female.

2000 census
As of the census of 2000, there were 1,011 people, 432 households, and 288 families living in the city. The population density was 944.8 people per square mile (364.8/km2). There were 471 housing units at an average density of 440.2 per square mile (170.0/km2). The racial makeup of the city was 95.94% White, 0.99% Native American, 0.30% Asian, 0.99% from other races, and 1.78% from two or more races. Hispanic or Latino of any race were 1.68% of the population.

There were 432 households, out of which 31.5% had children under the age of 18 living with them, 53.0% were married couples living together, 10.9% had a female householder with no husband present, and 33.3% were non-families. 28.9% of all households were made up of individuals, and 10.9% had someone living alone who was 65 years of age or older. The average household size was 2.34 and the average family size was 2.88.

In the city, the age distribution of the population shows 26.9% under the age of 18, 5.7% from 18 to 24, 30.4% from 25 to 44, 23.9% from 45 to 64, and 13.1% who were 65 years of age or older. The median age was 38 years. For every 100 females, there were 94.0 males. For every 100 females age 18 and over, there were 93.0 males.

The median income for a household in the city was $34,583, and the median income for a family was $41,125. Males had a median income of $30,804 versus $25,515 for females. The per capita income for the city was $15,754. About 8.6% of families and 9.5% of the population were below the poverty line, including 9.2% of those under age 18 and 18.7% of those age 65 or over.

Notable people
 Raymond Alvah Hanson, inventor and entrepreneur
 Donald W. Meinig, historian
 Mouse Davis, American football coach

References

External links

 Palouse official website

Cities in Whitman County, Washington
Cities in Washington (state)
Populated places established in 1875